The canton of Kingersheim is an administrative division of the Haut-Rhin department, northeastern France. It was created at the French canton reorganisation which came into effect in March 2015. Its seat is in Kingersheim.

It consists of the following communes:

Galfingue
Heimsbrunn
Kingersheim
Lutterbach
Morschwiller-le-Bas
Pfastatt
Reiningue
Richwiller

References

Cantons of Haut-Rhin